Isidoro Noblía is a small town (villa) in the Cerro Largo Department of eastern Uruguay.

Geography

Location

History
Its status was elevated to "Pueblo" (village) on 15 November 1963 by the Act of Ley Nº 13.167 and then to "Villa" (town) on 20 October 1992 by the Act of Ley Nº 16.312

Population
In 2011 Isidoro Noblía had a population of 2,331.
 
Source: Instituto Nacional de Estadística de Uruguay

References

External links
INE map of Isidoro Noblía

Populated places in the Cerro Largo Department